Patrice Ann "Pat" Murphy (born March 9, 1955) is an American science writer and author of science fiction and fantasy novels.

Early life
Murphy was born on March 9, 1955, in Washington state.

Career
Murphy has used the ideas of the absurdist pseudophilosophy pataphysics in some of her writings. Along with Lisa Goldstein and Michaela Roessner, she has formed The Brazen Hussies to promote their work. Together with Karen Joy Fowler, Murphy co-founded the James Tiptree, Jr. Award in 1991.

With her second novel, The Falling Woman (1986), she won the Nebula Award, and another Nebula Award in the same year for her novelette, "Rachel in Love."  Her short story collection, Points of Departure (1990) won the Philip K. Dick Award, and her 1990 novella, Bones, won the World Fantasy Award in 1991.

From 1998 through 2018, Pat Murphy and Paul Doherty (a scientist and educator) jointly wrote the recurring 'Science' column in the Magazine of Fantasy & Science Fiction that typically appeared twice each year.  Their last column was in the May/June 2018 issue; Doherty died in August 2017.

Personal life
She lives in Nevada and, for more than 20 years, when she was not writing science fiction, she worked at the Exploratorium, San Francisco's museum of science, art, and human perception. There, she published non-fiction as part of the museum staff.

In 2014, Murphy was hired by Doug Peltz to join Mystery Science (company) as the first employee, creating science curriculum for elementary school teachers.

She has a black belt in the martial art kenpō.

Bibliography

Novels 
 The Shadow Hunter (1982; partially rewritten and republished in 2002)
 The Falling Woman (1986)
 The City, Not Long After (1989)
 Nadya: The Wolf Chronicles (1996)
 There and Back Again (1999)
 Wild Angel (2001)
 Adventures in Time and Space with Max Merriwell (2002)
 The Wild Girls (children's novel) (2007)

Short fiction
Collections
 Points of Departure (1990)
 Women Up to No Good (2013)
Stories

Anthologies edited 
 The James Tiptree Award Anthology 1 (2005) with Debbie Notkin, Karen Joy Fowler  and Jeffrey D. Smith. Tachyon Publications
 The James Tiptree Award Anthology 2 (2006) with Debbie Notkin, Karen Joy Fowler and Jeffrey D. Smith. Tachyon Publications.
 The James Tiptree Award Anthology 3 (2007) with Debbie Notkin, Karen Joy Fowler and Jeffrey D. Smith. Tachyon Publications.

Nonfiction
 
 Imaginary Friends (1996 essay)
 Before and After (1997 travel essay)
 Explorabook: A Kid's Science Museum in a Book by John Cassidy, Pat Murphy, and Paul Doherty (1991)
 
 By Nature's Design (1993) by Pat Murphy
 The Science Explorer (1996) by Pat Murphy, Ellen Klages, and Linda Shore
 The Color of Nature (1996) by Pat Murphy and Paul Doherty
 The Science Explorer Out and About (1997) by Pat Murphy, Ellen Klages, and Linda Shore
 Zap Science: A Scientific Playground in a Book (1997) by John Cassidy, Paul Doherty, & Pat Murphy

References

External links
 Pat Murphy's page at Brazen Hussies
 
 Pat Murphy interview at The Well
 Mystery Science: Open and Go lessons that inspire kids to love science!

1955 births
Living people
20th-century American novelists
20th-century American short story writers
20th-century American women writers
21st-century American novelists
21st-century American short story writers
21st-century American women writers
American fantasy writers
American science fiction writers
American women novelists
American women short story writers
Chapbook writers
Nebula Award winners
The Magazine of Fantasy & Science Fiction people
Women science fiction and fantasy writers
World Fantasy Award-winning writers